Fabral (full name: Fábrica Brasileira de Automóveis Ltda, or "the Brazilian Car Factory") is an off-road vehicle manufacturer based in Palmas, Tocantins, Brazil. Fabral was established in 2002 with money from the Mozambiquean Tricôs group. The company's first president was Abdul Majid Ibraimo. They depended on tax breaks provided by the government of the state of Tocantins where the company is located.

Fabral produces the Santana Jalapao and Santana Anibal, both based on Santana PS-10 vehicles by Spain's Santana Motors, which themselves are based on the Land Rover Defender. This was aimed at replacing the defunct Toyota Bandeirante off-roader, with the aim of receiving government orders. Other vehicles planned include a Tata double-cab pickup truck and a South Korean bus. Their products are intended to be sold through Ssangyong dealerships, as these also belong to the Tricôs group.

References

 
 Santana PS 10, which is manufactured by Fabral under the Jalapao name.

Car manufacturers of Brazil
Vehicle manufacturing companies established in 2002
2002 establishments in Brazil
Brazilian brands
Economy of Tocantins
Palmas, Tocantins